Sergey Konov (born 28 February 1948) is a Uzbekistani former butterfly swimmer. He competed in two events at the 1968 Summer Olympics for the Soviet Union.

References

External links
 

1948 births
Living people
Soviet male butterfly swimmers
Uzbekistani male butterfly swimmers
Olympic swimmers of the Soviet Union
Swimmers at the 1968 Summer Olympics
Sportspeople from Tashkent